L'Hôtel is a 5-star luxury hotel in Saint-Germain-des-Prés, Paris.
It was built in the 19th century and has had various names, Hôtel d’Allemagne, then Hôtel d’Alsace (after the Franco-Prussian War), and was renamed L'Hôtel in 1963.

Oscar Wilde spent his last days there in 1900, when it was known as the Hôtel d'Alsace.
The hotel appears to have been run-down at the time, but Wilde remarked "I am dying beyond my means". Other former residents include Marlon Brando, actress and singer Mistinguett, and the blind writer Jorge Luis Borges, who said it seemed to have been "sculpted by a cabinet maker". The hosting of Borges in this hotel was not by chance: when he was nine, he translated Wilde's "The Happy Prince" into Spanish and since then he had become a big fan of his work; Borges wanted to die where the writer of his childhood had also died.

Gallery

References

Further reading 
 Garcia, Jacques, "L’Hôtel : the past revisited". Paris Capitale

External links 

Hotels in Paris
Buildings and structures in the 6th arrondissement of Paris
Oscar Wilde